Andancette is a commune in the Drôme department in southeastern France.

Geography
Andancette is located:
  from Saint-Rambert-d'Albon
  from Saint-Vallier
  from Valence

Population

See also
Communes of the Drôme department

References

Communes of Drôme
Dauphiné